Conklin may refer to:

Places
In the United States
 Conklin, Missouri, an unincorporated community
 Conklin, New York, a town
 Conklin, Michigan, an unincorporated community

Elsewhere
 Conklin, Alberta, a hamlet in Alberta, Canada

People
 Conklin (surname)

Other
 Conklin Shows, a North American amusement company

See also
 Conkling (disambiguation)